Viișoara is a commune in Cluj County, Transylvania, Romania. It is composed of two villages, Urca (Mezőőrke) and Viișoara.

Demographics 
According to the census from 2002 there was a total population of 5,852 people living in this commune. Of this population, 65.92% are ethnic Romanians, 24.21% are ethnic Hungarians and 9.80% ethnic Romani.

Natives
Andor Fejér

References

Communes in Cluj County
Localities in Transylvania